In Riemannian geometry, Gauss's lemma asserts that any sufficiently small sphere centered at a point in a Riemannian manifold is perpendicular to every geodesic through the point.  More formally, let M be a Riemannian manifold, equipped with its Levi-Civita connection, and p a point of M.  The exponential map is a mapping from the tangent space at p to M:

which is a diffeomorphism in a neighborhood of zero.  Gauss' lemma asserts that the image of a sphere of sufficiently small radius in TpM under the exponential map is perpendicular to all geodesics originating at p. The lemma allows the exponential map to be understood as a radial isometry, and is of fundamental importance in the study of geodesic convexity and normal coordinates.

Introduction 

So, if  is complete, then, by the Hopf–Rinow theorem,  is defined on the whole tangent space.

Since , it is clear that we can choose .

The Gauss Lemma now tells that  is also a radial isometry.

The exponential map is a radial isometry
Let . In what follows, we make the identification .

Gauss's Lemma states: 
Then, 

For , this lemma means that  is a radial isometry in the following sense: let , i.e. such that  is well defined. 
And let .

Proof

Recall that 

We proceed in three steps:
  : let us construct a curve 
Since , we can put . 
Therefore, 

The last equality is true because  is a geodesic, therefore  is parallel.

Now let us calculate the scalar product . 

In particular, we put , . 

The preceding step implies directly:

We must therefore show that the second term is null, because, according to Gauss's Lemma, we must have:

  : 

Let us define the curve

Note that 

Let us put:

and we calculate:

and

Hence

We can now verify that this scalar product is actually independent of the variable , and therefore that, for example: 

because, according to what has been given above:

being given that the differential is a linear map. This will therefore prove the lemma.
 We verify that : this is a direct calculation. Since the maps  are geodesics, 

Since the maps  are geodesics, 
the function  is constant. Thus,

See also 

 Riemannian geometry
 Metric tensor

References 

 

Articles containing proofs
Lemmas
Riemannian geometry
Riemannian manifolds
Theorems in Riemannian geometry